Lars Storhaug  (born 28 September 1935) is a Norwegian farmer and politician.

He was born in Klepp to farmers Lars Storhaug Sr. (1898-1977) and Borghild née Skadsem (1914-2000). He was elected representative to the Storting for the period 1985–1989 for the Conservative Party.

He was a brother of Åge Storhaug.

References

1935 births
Living people
People from Klepp
Norwegian farmers
Conservative Party (Norway) politicians
Members of the Storting